Smothers is a surname. People with this surname include:

People
 Clay Smothers (1935–2004), African-American member of the Texas House of Representatives 1977–81
 Dick Smothers (born 1939), American comedian, composer and musician, one half of the Smothers Brothers, father of Dick Smothers, Jr.
 Howard Smothers (born 1973), American football offensive lineman
 Jessie Belle Smothers (AKA Jessie Belle McCoy, born 1985), American model, professional wrestling valet, and professional wrestler
 Joseph Smothers (fl. 1870s), Baptist minister and state legislator in Mississippi
 Little Smokey Smothers (1939–2010), American blues guitarist and singer, younger brother of Otis "Big Smokey" Smothers
 Otis "Big Smokey" Smothers (1929–1993), American blues guitarist and singer, elder brother of Little Smokey Smothers
 Smothers Brothers, American double act consisting of Dick and Tom Smothers
 Tom Smothers (born 1937), American comedian, composer and musician, one half of the Smothers Brothers
 Tracy Smothers (1962–2020), American professional wrestler

See also 
 Smother (disambiguation)